Yukhta is a rural locality (a settlement) in Dmitriyevsky Selsoviet of Svobodnensky District, Amur Oblast, Russia. The population was 457 as of 2018. There are 9 streets.

Geography 
Yukhta is located on the right bank of the Bolshaya Pyora River, 19 km north of Svobodny (the district's administrative centre) by road. Dmitriyevka is the nearest rural locality.

References 

Rural localities in Svobodnensky District